Hymenoscyphus albidus is a saprotrophic fungus which grows on the dead leaves of ash trees.

Hymenoscyphus albidus has been known from Europe since 1851 and is not regarded as pathogenic. It is distinct from, but closely resembles, the pathogenic fungus Hymenoscyphus fraxineus (formerly known as Hymenoscyphus pseudoalbidus). Although Hymenoscyphus albidus is "morphologically virtually identical" to Hymenoscyphus fraxineus, there are substantial genetic differences between the two species.

References 

Helotiaceae
Taxa named by John Baptiste Henri Joseph Desmazières